Zachary Joe Wells (born February 26, 1981, in Costa Mesa, California) is an American former professional soccer player who played as a goalkeeper.

College
Wells played college soccer at UCLA from 1999 to 2003, where he helped the school to the NCAA Championship as a junior, and was named first-team All-Pac-10 as a senior.

MLS
Upon graduating, Wells was selected 21st overall in the 2004 MLS SuperDraft by the MetroStars.  He spent much of the season backing up national teamer Jonny Walker, but played two games in mid-season. In 2005, with Walker recovering from surgery, Wells took over the starting role, and played well, leading to Walker's trade to Columbus. But the return of Tony Meola to the club left Wells being a backup again. He was traded to Houston for a 4th round pick in the 2006 MLS SuperDraft. He was acquired along with a conditional draft pick by D.C. United for Bobby Boswell on December 12, 2007. 

Wells announced his retirement from professional soccer on February 17, 2009, just a month before the start of the 2009 MLS season.

National team
Wells earned his only cap for the U.S. national team on February 19, 2006, in a  4–0 victory over Guatemala at Pizza Hut Park in Frisco, Texas.

Honors

Houston Dynamo
Major League Soccer MLS Cup (2): 2006, 2007

References

1981 births
Living people
American soccer players
Association football goalkeepers
D.C. United players
Houston Dynamo FC players
Major League Soccer players
New York Red Bulls draft picks
New York Red Bulls players
People from Costa Mesa, California
UCLA Bruins men's soccer players
United States men's international soccer players
Newport Harbor High School alumni
NCAA Division I Men's Soccer Tournament Most Outstanding Player winners